The Buenos Aires Metropolitan Cathedral is the main Catholic church in Buenos Aires, Argentina. It is located in the city center, overlooking Plaza de Mayo, on the corner of San Martín and Rivadavia streets, in the San Nicolás neighbourhood. It is the mother church of the Archdiocese of Buenos Aires and the primatial church of Argentina.

The Cathedral of Buenos Aires was rebuilt several times since its humble origins in the 16th century. The present building is a mix of architectural styles, with an 18th-century nave and dome and a severe, 19th-century Neoclassical façade without towers. The interior keeps precious 18th-century statues and altarpieces, as well as abundant Neo-Renaissance and Neo-Baroque decoration.

History and architecture

Origins

During the definitive foundation of Buenos Aires by Juan de Garay in 1580, part of a block facing the main square was reserved for the major church of the town. This is still the location of the current Cathedral, which is the last building in a series of previous churches that occupied the site.

At the time of its foundation, the town depended on the diocese of Asunción (in today's Paraguay). The first main church of Buenos Aires was a modest building made of wood and adobe, and was replaced by a new one in 1605 by Governor Hernandarias. This second building was also in danger of collapse by 1616 and had to be rebuilt again, something which was done around 1618. In 1620, Buenos Aires was made seat of a bishopric by Pope Paul V. Its main church now had the status of a cathedral.

After 1662, the cathedral was again rebuilt under bishop Cristóbal de la Mancha y Velazco and governor José Martínez de Salazar, being re-inaugurated in 1671. The cathedral now had three naves covered by a wooden roof and a tower. Due to the bad quality of its building materials, the tower and the roof of this church fell down in the early 1680s. The whole church was again rebuilt, starting in 1684, under bishop Azcona Imberto. In 1695 the building was almost finished, with the flanking towers of the façade and the sacristy still to be completed.

In the early 18th century the works were slow, and the first tower was finished only around 1721. The second tower was begun in 1722 and finished around 1725. The main façade was redesigned between 1725 and 1727 by the Italian Jesuit Giovanni Bianchi (also spelled Blanqui). The design of the new façade was directly inspired by Italian Mannerist architecture.

Definitive building 

On the night of May 23, 1752, the nave of the cathedral collapsed. The only portions still standing were the façade and towers, but the rest of the building needed to be completely rebuilt once again. Italian architect Antonio Masella was put in charge of the project, and the works began already in 1753. Masella designed a majestic church, much larger than the previous structure, with a three-aisled nave covered with barrel vaulting and lateral chapels. A dome was to sit over the crossing. Upon completion of the dome, however, fissures in the structure were detected and it had to be rebuilt. Masella was removed from the project and prosecuted by the authorities, although later acquitted.

The dome was rebuilt by Portuguese architect Manuel Álvarez de Rocha after 1770. The façade by Blanqui and the towers were finally demolished in 1778, since they were too small in comparison to the scale of the new cathedral. An elegant project for a new façade with two flanking towers, combining Rococo and Neoclassical elements, was presented by the Portuguese military engineer José Custódio de Sá e Faria, but financial constraints prevented the realisation of the project. The cathedral was consecrated in 1791 without façade.

Construction of a façade began in the early 19th century directed by Spanish architect Tomás Toribio, but the project did not advance much. It was only in 1821, under Governor Martín Rodríguez and his Minister Bernardino Rivadavia, that plans to complete the cathedral were taken seriously. Starting in 1826, French architects Prosper Catelin and Pierre Benoit built a new Neoclassical façade for the cathedral inspired by the Palais Bourbon in Paris. Construction was temporarily halted in 1827, and when it resumed, progress was slow until its final completion. The façade of the building consists of a tall portico, inspired by Classical architecture, with twelve columns and a triangular pediment on top. The portico lends the building the appearance of an ancient temple rather than a Catholic church. The original project did not call for towers to be built and, even though there were later plans to build two towers, they were never materialized.

The decoration of the façade was only finished between 1860 and 1863, when French sculptor Joseph Dubourdieu created the reliefs of the pediment. The scene represents the reunion of Joseph with his brothers and father Jacob in Egypt, and was intended as an allegory of the unity of the Argentine nation after several fratricide wars. Dubourdieu also completed the Corinthian capitals of the columns of the portico.

Interior 

The Cathedral of Buenos Aires is a Latin cross building with transept and three-aisles with side chapels connected by corridors. Originally the interior was only decorated with altarpieces, but at the end of the 19th century the walls and ceilings of the church were decorated with frescoes depicting biblical scenes painted the Italian Francesco Paolo Parisi. In 1907, the floor of the cathedral was covered with Venetian-style mosaics designed by the Italian Carlo Morra. Repair work for the entire floor was started in 2004 and completed in 2010.

The cathedral still has some elements dating from colonial times. The most important is the main gilt wood altarpiece in Rococo style, dating from 1785 and executed by Spanish sculptor Isidro Lorea. The altarpiece occupies the main chapel and has a statue of the Virgin Mary and a representation of the Holy Trinity in its canopy.

Another notable colonial sculpture is the Christ of Buenos Aires, a large image of the crucified Christ located in the altarpiece of the lateral arm of the transept. The statue was carved by Portuguese sculptor Manuel do Coyto in 1671 and is the oldest in the cathedral. According to the faithful, it has miraculously saved the city from a flood in the 18th century.

The two pulpits of the cathedral, in transitional Rococo-Neoclassical style, were created in 1789–1790 by the Spanish sculptor Juan Antonio Gaspar Hernández, who would later (1799) direct the first art school of Buenos Aires.

An 1871 Walcker organ (Opus 263) is at the chorus section. It has more than 3500 pipes, and was made in Germany with the finest materials available at that time. Titular Organist is Mr. Enrique Rimoldi, who offers periodically organ concerts for free. This organ is quite well conserved and its intonation was preserved as close as possible to the original. It is currently recognised as one of the finest Walcker Organs ever manufactured.

The Cathedral itself could be considered as a pictorial museum as well. E.g., for the Calvarium (14 stations, always present in any catholic church), there are 14 magnificent pictures, made "al óleo", this is, with oil painting and traditional canvas, all originals, with dimensions of more than  each.

Mausoleum of General San Martín 

In 1880, the remains of General José de San Martín were brought from France and placed in a mausoleum, reachable from the right aisle of the church. The mausoleum was specially designed by French sculptor Albert-Ernest Carrier-Belleuse, with marble of various colours. The black sarcophagus is guarded by three life-size female figures that represent Argentina, Chile and Peru, three of the regions freed by the General. The mausoleum also has the remains of Generals Juan Gregorio de las Heras and Tomás Guido, as well as those of the Unknown Soldier of the Independence.

See also 

 Plaza de Mayo
 Roman Catholicism in Argentina
 Architecture of Argentina
 Archdiocese of Buenos Aires

Gallery

External links 

 Official site of the cathedral 
  – Argentine Independence War soldier buried there
 

18th-century Roman Catholic church buildings in Argentina
20th-century Roman Catholic church buildings in Argentina
Roman Catholic cathedrals in Buenos Aires Province
Buildings and structures in Buenos Aires
Roman Catholic churches completed in 1791
National Historic Monuments of Argentina
Tourist attractions in Buenos Aires
Christianity in Buenos Aires
Roman Catholic churches in Buenos Aires
Cathedrals in Buenos Aires
19th-century Roman Catholic church buildings in Argentina